Lampo (c. 1950 – 22 July 1961) was a mixed-breed dog that became famous for his rail journeys across Italy.

History 

In August 1953, Lampo, then a stray dog, got off a cargo train at the Campiglia Marittima railway station in Italy and was adopted by the stationmaster Elvio Barlettani, despite the strict rail regulations. Soon the dog had learned the train schedules, distinguishing the slow trains from the fast ones and how to get somewhere every day and return at sunset. Almost every morning he traveled by train from Campiglia Marittima to Piombino to accompany Mirna, the stationmaster's daughter in her way to school. He then was returned to Campiglia on a different train. He would often board other trains, traversing by himself the italian railroad network, always returning to base in Campiglia Marittima by train.

After a few years, the management of the Florence railway forced Barlettani to remove the dog. Lampo was put on a cargo train to Naples, but he managed to return after a few days. Later Lampo was given to a friend of the stationmaster in Barletta. After about five months, the dog managed to return to Campiglia Marittima, where he officially became the mascot of the railway station. His story intrigued journalists around the world, who dedicated television services, articles and covers to his story.

On the evening of July 22, 1961 in Campiglia Marittima, a maneuvering cargo train hit the dog, who was then buried in the flowerbed at the foot of an acacia tree at the railway station.

Commemoration 

Shortly after his death, thanks to railway workers and the American magazine This Week, a monument was inaugurated at the Campiglia Marittima railway station in memory of Lampo.

In 1962 the book Lampo, the Traveling Dog (Italian: Lampo, il cane viaggiatore) was written by the stationmaster, Elvio Barlettani (died July 2006). The Garzanti publishing house published the book. It became successful with about fifteen editions until 2009 and has been translated into English, French, German, Japanese and Bengali. 

In 1967 story of Lampo was fictionalized by the Polish writer Roman Pisarski in the short story O psie, który jeździł koleją that has become school reading in the third grade classes of primary schools in Poland.

References

Bibliography
 Lampo, the Traveling Dog by Elvio Barlettani, Garzanti, 1962.
 O psie, który jeździł koleją by Roman Pisarski, Biuro Wydawnicze "Ruch", 1967.

Filmography 
 Lampo, cane viaggiatore, 1962.
 Il cane viaggiatore by Simone Paradisi, 2011

Individual dogs
1961 animal deaths
Male mammals
History of rail transport in Italy